Events from the year 1921 in Canada.

Incumbents

Crown 
 Monarch – George V

Federal government 
 Governor General – Victor Cavendish, 9th Duke of Devonshire (until August 11) then Julian Byng 
 Prime Minister – Arthur Meighen (until December 29) then William Lyon Mackenzie King
 Chief Justice – Louis Henry Davies (Prince Edward Island) 
 Parliament – 13th (until 4 October)

Provincial governments

Lieutenant governors 
Lieutenant Governor of Alberta – Robert Brett 
Lieutenant Governor of British Columbia – Walter Cameron Nichol  
Lieutenant Governor of Manitoba – James Albert Manning Aikins    
Lieutenant Governor of New Brunswick – William Pugsley 
Lieutenant Governor of Nova Scotia – MacCallum Grant   
Lieutenant Governor of Ontario – Lionel Herbert Clarke (until August 29) then Henry Cockshutt (from September 10)
Lieutenant Governor of Prince Edward Island – Murdock MacKinnon 
Lieutenant Governor of Quebec – Charles Fitzpatrick  
Lieutenant Governor of Saskatchewan – Richard Stuart Lake (until February 17) then Henry William Newlands

Premiers 
Premier of Alberta – Charles Stewart (until August 13) then Herbert Greenfield  
Premier of British Columbia – John Oliver  
Premier of Manitoba – Tobias Norris  
Premier of New Brunswick – Walter Foster 
Premier of Nova Scotia – George Henry Murray 
Premier of Ontario – Ernest Drury   
Premier of Prince Edward Island – John Howatt Bell 
Premier of Quebec – Louis-Alexandre Taschereau 
Premier of Saskatchewan – William Melville Martin

Territorial governments

Commissioners 
 Gold Commissioner of Yukon – George P. MacKenzie 
 Commissioner of Northwest Territories – William Wallace Cory

Events
March 26 – The Bluenose is launched
 May 28 and 29 – Founding of the Communist Party of Canada at a clandestine meeting held in a barn in Guelph, Ontario
June 9 – 1921 Saskatchewan general election: William M. Martin's Liberals win a fifth consecutive majority
June 15 – Prohibition comes to an end in British Columbia
July 18 – 1921 Alberta general election: The United Farmers of Alberta (UFA) win a majority, defeating Premier Charles Stewart's Liberals. Henry Wise Wood, who had remained president of the UFA despite opposing its branching into electoral politics, declines the premiership. The UFA caucus hastily selects Herbert Greenfield to become premier.
July 27 – Frederick Banting and Charles Best discover insulin
August 13 – Herbert Greenfield becomes premier of Alberta, replacing Charles Stewart
November 21 – Canada is granted its armorial bearings by Royal Proclamation. Canada's official colours declared to be red and white
December 6 – Federal election: William Lyon Mackenzie King's Liberals win a minority, defeating Arthur Meighen's Conservatives. Agnes Macphail becomes the first woman elected to Parliament, representing the rural Ontario riding of Grey South East. That election was the first in which all Canadian women (at least 21 years of age) had the right to vote and to stand as candidates. Macphail was  re-elected to the House of Commons four times and served for more than eighteen years. Later, she would be one of the first two women elected to the Ontario legislature.
December 29 – Mackenzie King becomes prime minister, replacing Arthur Meighen.

Full date unknown
The school board in Victoria, British Columbia, creates a segregated school for the Chinese population.  After a boycott of the new school, the plan is scrapped.
 A study of Saskatchewan school students discovers that 56% of them are infected with tuberculosis
Mary Ellen Smith in British Columbia becomes the first woman cabinet minister in Canada.
 The Cenotaph, Montreal, is unveiled
 The War Memorial of Montreal West is unveiled

Arts and literature
February 15 – The Capitol Theatre opened in Winnipeg.
March 12 – The Capitol Theatre, a lush 2,500 seat movie palace, opened on Vancouver's Granville Street.

Sports
March 24–26 – The Manitoba Junior Hockey League's Winnipeg Falcons win their only Memorial Cup by defeating the Ontario Hockey Association's Stratford Midgets 11 to 9 in a 2-game aggregate played Arena Gardens in Toronto
April 4 – The Ottawa Senators beat the Vancouver Millionaires 2–1 to win the Stanley Cup
December 3 – In the first East-West Grey Cup the Toronto Argonauts win their second Grey Cup championship by defeating the Edmonton Eskimos 23 to 0 in the 9th Grey Cup played at Toronto's Varsity Stadium

Births

January to March

January 6 – Hazen Argue, politician (d. 1991)
January 9 – Lister Sinclair, broadcaster, playwright and polymath (d. 2006)
January 20 – Jacques Ferron, physician and author, founder of the Parti Rhinocéros (d. 1985)
February 8 – Barney Danson, politician and soldier (d. 2011)
February 11 – Johnny Fripp, skier and football player (d. 2022)
February 14 – Hazel McCallion, politician and 5th Mayor of Mississauga (d. 2023)
February 17 – Muriel Coben, baseball and curling player (d. 1979)
February 21 – George Manuel, Aboriginal leader (d. 1989)
February 25 – Pierre Laporte, Quebec politician and Minister, kidnapped and murdered by Front de libération du Québec (FLQ) (d. 1970)
March 10 – Cec Linder, actor (d. 1992)
March 27 – Calvin Gotlieb, professor and computer scientist (d. 2016)

April to June
April 1 – Ken Reardon, ice hockey player (d. 2008)
April 4 – Charles Dubin, lawyer and former Chief Justice of Ontario (d. 2008)
April 30 – Don Jamieson, politician, diplomat and broadcaster (d. 1986)
May 5 – Jim Conacher, ice hockey player (d. 2020)
May 12 – Farley Mowat, conservationist and author (d. 2014)
May 31 – Peter Fox, politician (d. 1989)
June 8 – Alexis Smith, actress (d. 1993)
June 25 
 Yves Forest, politician (d. 2019)
Celia Franca, ballet dancer and founder and artistic director of the National Ballet of Canada (d. 2007)

July to December

July 1 – Arthur Johnson, sprint canoeist (d. 2003)
July 6 –   Allan MacEachen, politician, Minister and senator, first Deputy Prime Minister of Canada (d. 2017)
August 4 – Maurice Richard, ice hockey player (d. 2000)
August 8 – John Herbert Chapman, scientist and space researcher (d. 1979)
August 11 – Allan Waters, businessman and media mogul (d. 2005)
August 25 – Monty Hall, game show host, producer, actor, singer and sportscaster (d. 2017)
September 5 – Murray Henderson, hockey player (Boston Bruins) (d. 2013)
September 14 – A. Jean de Grandpré, lawyer and businessman (d. 2022)
September 15 – Norma MacMillan, voice actress (d. 2001)
September 16 – Ursula Franklin, metallurgist, research physicist, author and educator (d. 2016)
September 29 – James Cross, British diplomat kidnapped by the Front de libération du Québec (FLQ) (d. 2021)
November 25 – Fraser Elliott, lawyer, supporter of the arts and philanthropist (d. 2005)
December 4 – Deanna Durbin, singer and actress (d. 2013)
December 6 – George Beurling, most successful Canadian fighter pilot of World War II (d. 1948) 
December 7 – Eric Blackwood, aviator
December 10 
 James Foort, inventor and artist (d. 2020)
 Howard Fredeen, scientist and animal breeding researcher (d. 2021)

Full date unknown
Fred Davis, broadcaster and moderator of Front Page Challenge (d. 1996)

Deaths

January 21 – Arthur Sifton, politician and 2nd Premier of Alberta (b. 1858)
August 29 – Lionel Herbert Clarke, businessman and Lieutenant Governor of Ontario (b. 1859)
October 19 – George Washington Kendall (b. 1881)
November 1 – Zoé Lafontaine, wife of Sir Wilfrid Laurier, 7th Prime Minister of Canada (b. 1842)
November 10 – Jennie Kidd Trout, physician, first woman in Canada legally to become a medical doctor and only woman in Canada licensed to practice medicine until 1880 (b. 1841)
November 27 – Douglas Colin Cameron, politician and Lieutenant-Governor of Manitoba (b. 1854)

See also
List of Canadian films

Historical documents
Frederick Banting speaks on his research into separating life-saving insulin from pancreas's insulin-destroying secretion

Former Indian agent says Kainai (Blood) cheated out of their land by "predatory leases"

Witness testifies to House committee on proportional representation so that MPs "may represent the opinions of people rather than acres"

Prime Minister Meighen rebuffs Opposition Leader Mackenzie King's attempt to advise on upcoming Imperial Conference

Prime Minister Meighen on unity in diversity in Commonwealth of Nations

"Dark, gloomy, and brutal, [with] a disrespect for law and order" - Nellie McClung says movies are moral menace

Police reject pleas to bust exposed knees

"Races have awakened intense interest" - Lunenburg fishing schooner Bluenose wins international race off Halifax

Christmas celebration at rural Prairie school

Franklin D. Roosevelt's family cottage on Campobello Island, N.B., preserved to last year he stayed there

References

 
Years of the 20th century in Canada
Canada
1921 in North America